Pryzm Brighton is a chain nightclub located within the Kingswest Centre on West St in Brighton, England.

History
The venue opened in October 1965 as a part of the nationwide chain Top Rank Suite. It was refurbished in 1973 and rebranded as Kingswest. It was refurbished in 1990 and renamed the Event, and then refurbished and renamed Event II in 1996. In 2007 another refurbishment led to it reopening as a part of the superclub chain Oceana and later becoming Pryzm.

References

Buildings and structures in Brighton and Hove
1965 establishments in England
Brighton and Hove
Nightclubs in England
Electronic dance music venues